Hubice is a village and municipality in the Dunajská Streda District in the Trnava Region of south-west Slovakia.

Etymology
The name is derived from gǫba (modern ) –  a mouth, referring probably to a mouth of the river bay. The same semantic shift exists e.g. in  – a bay.

History
In historical records the village was first mentioned in 1293 (Gumba). Until the end of World War I, it was part of Hungary and fell within the Somorja district of Pozsony County. After the Austro-Hungarian army disintegrated in November 1918, Czechoslovak troops occupied the area. After the Treaty of Trianon of 1920, the village became officially part of Czechoslovakia. In November 1938, the First Vienna Award granted the area to Hungary and it was held by Hungary until 1945. After Soviet occupation in 1945, Czechoslovak administration returned and the village became officially part of Czechoslovakia in 1947.

Demography 
At the 2001 Census the recorded population of the village was 504 while an end-2008 estimate by the Statistical Office had the village's population as 546. As of 2001, 77.18% of its population were Hungarians, while 22.02% were Slovaks. Roman Catholicism is the majority religion of the village, its adherents numbering 92.86% of the total population.

Geography
The municipality lies at an altitude of 126 metres and covers an area of 5.360 km². It has a population of about 510 people.

See also
 List of municipalities and towns in Slovakia

References

Genealogical resources

The records for genealogical research are available at the state archive "Statny Archiv in Bratislava, Slovakia"
 Roman Catholic church records (births/marriages/deaths): 1673-1898 (parish B)

External links
Surnames of living people in Hubice

Villages and municipalities in Dunajská Streda District
Hungarian communities in Slovakia